Miguel Frasconi (born May 29, 1956 in New York City) is an American composer who often uses improvisation, electronics, and experimental musical instruments.

Work
He has used new glass instruments, and was a founding member of The Glass Orchestra from 1977 to 1986.

He has also worked with John Cage, Jon Hassell, Paul Dresher, John Oswald, and, since 2004, Morton Subotnick.

Education
In 1979, he received his B.F.A. from York University, Toronto, where he studied composition with James Tenney, electronic music with Richard Teitelbaum and David Rosenboom, improvisation with Casey Sokol, and Carnatic music with Jon B. Higgins and Trichy Sankaran.

References

External links
frasconimusic website
 Miguel Frasconi myspace-music page
Steeling Beauty: The inventive instruments of Mobius Operandi's Oliver DiCicco (SFGate.com)

American male classical composers
American classical composers
21st-century classical composers
1956 births
Living people
York University alumni
21st-century American composers
21st-century American male musicians